Avijatičarsko Naselje, also known as Avijacija, is an urban neighborhood of the city of Novi Sad, Serbia.

Borders

The south-eastern border of Avijatičarsko Naselje is Ulica Oblačića Rada (Oblačića Rada Street), the north-eastern border is Rumenački put (Rumenka Road), and the western border is a future new section of Subotički bulevar (Subotica Boulevard), which will be built in 2007.

Neighbouring city quarters

The neighbouring city quarters are: Jugovićevo in the west, Detelinara in the southeast, and Industrijska Zona Jug in the northeast.

Name and history

Construction of the settlement started in 1948 and it was named after Avijatičarski put (Avijatičar Road), a road that lead to the local airport.

Famous citizens

The famous citizens of Avijatičarsko Naselje were literates Miroslav Antić and Ferenc Deak.

Gallery

See also
Neighborhoods of Novi Sad

References

Jovan Mirosavljević, Brevijar ulica Novog Sada 1745–2001, Novi Sad, 2002.
Milorad Grujić, Vodič kroz Novi Sad i okolinu, Novi Sad, 2004.

External links
Detailed map of Novi Sad and Avijatičarsko Naselje
Map

Novi Sad neighborhoods